RBS 70 (Robotsystem 70) is a man-portable air-defense system (MANPADS) designed for anti-aircraft warfare in all climate zones and with little to no support from other forces. Originally designed and manufactured by the Swedish defence firm of Bofors Defence (now Saab Bofors Dynamics, since 2000). It uses the RB 70 missile which is also in use in a number of other Swedish missile systems.

History

Before RBS 70 the mainstay of Swedish short range air defence was Robotsystem  69 (American Redeye ) and the Swedish Bofors m/48 AAA, Development of the Rbs 70 to supply the Swedish air defence with a low-cost, easy-to-use and effective short-range SAM system began in 1969 when Bofors AB was contracted, who decided to use a novel guidance system in form of a laser-beam riding missile co-developed with Laser Diode Laboratories. Further studies showed the need of a radar and an Identification friend or foe-system which were ordered from LM Ericsson  and Svenska Aktiebolaget Trådlös Telegrafi (SATT) respectively in 1972. 
This became the first missile system to fully use computer simulated firing, with some 10 000 shots taken during development. IN 1975, the finished system went into series production, and Rbs 70 was taken into service in 1977. IN 1982, the missile was improved to mk I, while the MK II came in 1990. The fourth generation, the Mach 2 "BOLIDE" all target missile appeared in 2003 along with improvements of the IFF-system and the ability to add a BORC thermal imager. The auto-tracking Rbs 70 Next Generation with an integrated thermal imager came in 2011, now with a range of 9000 metres and 5000 metre height coverage.

As a side development, the vehicle mounted all-weather Robotsystem 90 was in service from 1993 to 2004, then mothballed until it was reactivated in 2017.

Design

The RBS 70 is a Short-range Air Defense (SHORAD) laser guided missile system.

Mk 1 and Mk 2 followed shortly and are the standard RBS 70 with a range of 5,000–6,000 m and a ceiling of 3,000 m. Currently, RBS 70 is operational in 20 customer countries, on all continents and in arctic, desert, and tropical environments.

In 2003 the "BOLIDE" upgrade system was introduced to the RBS 70. Deliveries were initiated in 2005.

Latest upgrade
In 2011, Saab Bofors Dynamics (successor company of Bofors Defence) announced the introduction of the new RBS 70 New Generation (RBS 70 NG). The upgraded version included an improved sighting system automatic target tracking capable of night vision and improved training and after-action review features.

Operational use
In 1990, the Royal Australian Navy embarked two RBS 70 units and Australian Army operators on board the fleet replenishment ship HMAS Success when it deployed to the Persian Gulf in the lead-up to the first Gulf War in Kuwait.

In 1992, a Venezuelan Army RBS 70 SAM is attributed with having shot down a rebel OV-10 Bronco during the 1992 Venezuelan coup d'état attempt on November 27.

Iran used the RBS 70 system during the Iran–Iraq War against Iraqi aircraft.

The Australian government has announced the Short Range Ground Based Air Defence in 2017. The plan is to find a replacement for the RBS-70. As of 2019 the NASAMS is the chosen option. Defence Department has signed a contract with Raytheon Australia. Planned replacement of the RBS-70 is financial year 2022–23.

Operators

Current operators
  Argentina
  Australia
  Bahrain
  Brazil RBS NG 
  Czech Republic RBS 70 and RBS 70 NG
  Finland, Ilmatorjuntaohjus 05 ( ITO05 and ITO05M)
  Indonesia
  Iran
  Ireland
  Latvia
  Lithuania
  Mexican Army
  Pakistan: Assembled since 1988. 1500 in service with the Pakistan Army.
 
  Sweden
  Thailand
  Tunisia
  United Arab Emirates
  Venezuela
  Ukraine

Former operators
  
Norwegian Army (Sold to Lithuania)

See also
 Luftvärnsrobotvagn 701 (Lvrbv 701), a self-propelled vehicle mounted version of RBS 70
 ASRAD-R (Advanced Short Range Air Defence System – RBS)
 9K38 Igla
 VSHORAD (India)
 Anza
 Misagh-2
 KP-SAM Shingung
 Qaem
 Starstreak Surface-to Air Missile
 FIM-92 Stinger Surface-to-Air Missile
 Mistral Surface-to-Air Missile
 List of missiles
 Starburst (missile)

References

External links

 Official SAAB company page of RBS 70
 Bofors RBS 70  at the Federation of American Scientists (FAS) website
 RBS 70 at GlobalSecurity.org
 RBS 70 NG VSHORAD Very Short Range Air Defense Missile System at armyrecognition.com

Surface-to-air missiles of Sweden
Guided missiles of Sweden
Military equipment introduced in the 1970s